Bourne Community College is a coeducational secondary school located in Southbourne, West Sussex, England specialising in STEM.

It is located close to Southbourne railway station, and is joined to the Bourne community leisure centre.

It is a foundation school administered by West Sussex County Council and the Bourne Community Trust. Facilities at the school include a STEM hub and AstroTurf football pitch.

Also there is some famous people in the Bourne e.g  CA

Plus extras 
. Mr Smith ( my g) 
. Miss ward (best tutor)

Plus many people who are bully's and very mean people have been kicked out or even suspended from the Bourne Community college.

References

External links
Bourne Community College official website

Foundation schools in West Sussex
Secondary schools in West Sussex